The 2015 Zhuhai ITF Women's Pro Circuit was a professional tennis tournament played on outdoor hard courts. It was the first edition of the tournament and part of the 2015 ITF Women's Circuit, offering a total of $50,000 in prize money. It took place at the Hengqin International Tennis Center in Zhuhai, China, on 28 September–4 October 2015.

Singles main draw entrants

Seeds 

 1 Rankings as of 21 September 2015

Other entrants 
The following players received wildcards into the singles main draw:
  Tian Ran
  Wang Qiang
  Xu Shilin
  You Xiaodi

The following players received entry from the qualifying draw:
  Chen Jiahui
  Gai Ao
  Xun Fangying
  Ye Qiuyu

Champions

Singles

 Chang Kai-chen def.  Zhang Yuxuan, 4–6, 6–1, 7–6(7–0)

Doubles

 Xu Shilin /  You Xiaodi def.  Irina Khromacheva /  Emily Webley-Smith, 3–6, 6–2, [10–4]

References

External links 
 2015 Zhuhai ITF Women's Pro Circuit at ITFtennis.com
 Official website 

2015
2015 ITF Women's Circuit
2015 in Chinese tennis